Kari Puranda Jeevithangal is a 1980 Indian Malayalam film,  directed by J. Sasikumar. The film stars Prem Nazir, Jayan, Jayabharathi and Jagathy Sreekumar in the lead roles. The film has musical score by M. K. Arjunan. This movie was later dubbed into Tamil-language as Meendum Savithri.

Plot
Train Engine drivers Balan and Raghavan are best friends. Balan was an orphan who was taken up by Daniel an official at the Railways and is in love with his daughter Daisy. Raghavan is a widower with a small child. When Balan rescues Savitri from hoodlums and takes her home, he's turned off by Daniel who cuts off all ties with him. Balan settles in the Railway quarters with Savitri whom everybody assumes is his wife.Raghavan is shocked to see her at Balan's home, for Savitri is his own wife whom he had abandoned years ago. Savitri's mother was the madam at a brothel and Raghavan suspected that she had taken the same way.

In the present day, the situation grows fraught as a distraught Savitri tries to see her daughter. But Raghavan callously prevents her. But she's aided in her efforts  by the tea-seller Mammookka who baby-sits the child. However when Raghavan learns of it, he's furious. A fight erupts between Balan and Raghavan when the latter insults Savitri. She admits to the truth that Raghavan is her husband. Meanwhile the child is kidnapped by hoodlums who are after Daisy, Balan's girl friend. Balan and Raghavan reunite to recover the child and the two friends and the two couples are reconciled.

Cast

Prem Nazir as Balan
Jayan as Raghavan
Jayabharathi as Savitri
Jagathy Sreekumar as Kunjappan 
Adoor Bhasi as Mammookka
Prameela
Sreelatha Namboothiri as Sarojini
T. R. Omana as Kamalakshiyamma
Cochin Haneefa as Muthalali
Balan K. Nair as Daniel
C. I. Paul as Bhaskaran
Sathyakala as Daisy
Vanchiyoor Radha as Katrina

Soundtrack
The music was composed by M. K. Arjunan and the lyrics were written by Chirayinkeezhu Ramakrishnan Nair.

References

External links
 

1980 films
1980s Malayalam-language films
Films directed by J. Sasikumar